Bone morphogenetic protein 1, also known as BMP1, is a protein which in humans is encoded by the BMP1 gene. There are seven isoforms of the protein created by alternate splicing.

Function
BMP1 belongs to the peptidase M12A family of bone morphogenetic proteins (BMPs). It induces bone and cartilage development. Unlike other BMPs, it does not belong to the TGFβ superfamily. It was initially discovered to work like other BMPs by inducing bone and cartilage development. It however, is a metalloprotease that cleaves the C-terminus of procollagen I, II and III. It has an astacin-like protease domain.

It has been shown to cleave laminin 5  and is localized in the basal epithelial layer of bovine skin.

The BMP1 locus encodes a protein that is capable of inducing formation of cartilage in vivo.  Although other bone morphogenetic proteins are members of the TGF-beta superfamily, BMP1 encodes a protein that is not closely related to other known growth factors. BMP1 protein and procollagen C proteinase (PCP), a secreted metalloprotease requiring calcium and needed for cartilage and bone formation, are identical. PCP or BMP1 protein cleaves the C-terminal propeptides of procollagen I, II, and III and its activity is increased by the procollagen C-endopeptidase enhancer protein.  The BMP1 gene is expressed as alternatively spliced variants that share an N-terminal protease domain but differ in their C-terminal region

Structure
The structure of BMP1 was determined through X-Ray diffraction with a resolution of 1.27 Å.  Crystallization experiments were done by vapor diffusion at a pH of 7.5.  This is important because it is close to the pH of the human body, where BMP1 resides in vivo.  BMP1 is 202 residues in length. Its secondary structure is made up of 30% helices, or 10 helices, 61 residues in length, and 15% beta sheets, or 11 strands, 32 residues in length.  It contains ligands of an acetyl group and a Zinc ion.

A Ramachandran plot was constructed for BMP.  This plot shows that BMP1 most prefers Phi and Psi angles (Phi, Psi) of around (-60°,-45°) and (-60°, 140°). These preferred angles are an estimate of the most clustered data of the Ramachandran plot.  The preferred region is much greater in range.  97% of the residues were in preferred regions and 100% of the residues were in the allowed region, with no outliers.

References

Further reading

External links
 
 
 
 The MEROPS online database for peptidases and their inhibitors: M12.005

Bone morphogenetic protein
Developmental genes and proteins
ZnMc domain
EGFCA domain
CUB domain